Sun Plaza may refer to:

 Sun Plaza (Bucharest), a shopping mall in Bucharest, Romania
 Sun Plaza, Singapore, a shopping mall in Sembawang, Singapore